Thomas R. "Tom" Bruce is an American academic and former software engineer who co-founded the Legal Information Institute at Cornell Law School with Peter Martin in 1992.

Education 
Bruce earned a Bachelor of Arts degree from Yale University and a Master of Fine Arts in stage management from the School of Drama at Yale University.

Career 
After graduating from Yale, Bruce worked as a stage and production manager for the Spoleto Festival USA, Texas Opera Theater, American Repertory Theater, and Greater Miami Opera. He joined Cornell Law School in 1988 as director of educational technologies. In 1992, Bruce co-founded the Legal Information Institute at Cornell. He is the author of Cello, the first Web browser for Microsoft Windows. Cello was first released on June 8, 1993.

References

External links
Legal Information Institute ("LII") at the Cornell Law School

Living people
American legal scholars
Yale School of Drama alumni
Year of birth missing (living people)